Jones is a surname of English and Welsh origin meaning "son of John". The surname is common in Wales. It evolved into variations of traditionally Welsh names: Ieuan, Iowan, Ioan, Iwan, or even Siôn (note how the letter 'J' was originally being pronounced as 'i', akin to how J is pronounced in the Latin alphabet). The sound generated from ‘Si-’ in Siôn is a Welsh approximation of the English ‘J’ sound that does not exist natively to the language (refer to Irish Seán), equivalent to the English ‘Sh’ such as in “shed.”

It may exist as an anglicisation of these names during periods in which many Welsh were changing their names and ridding their patronymic names (“Ap Rhys” to “Prys” and then “Price” in English, or attaching an ‘-s’ to the end of a given name to signify an old patronym: “Owain” to “Owen” to finally “Owens”), or English speakers transliterating these names to a more conventional spelling through mishearing. They may also come from the English patronymic “Johns,” or “Johnson” (“son of John”).

History

The surname Jones first appears on record as a surname in England in 1273 with the name "Matilda Jones". Others put the first known record of the surname Jones as 1279, in Huntingdonshire, England. Around the time of the Laws in Wales Acts in the early to mid 16th century, the traditional Welsh system of patronymics was increasingly replaced by the English system of surnames, since English was the official state language and all official documents needed to be in English. This led to the Anglicisation of Welsh names, meaning that English Christian names (such as John) became increasingly common surnames to distinctively Welsh Christian first names such as Meredudd (Meredith) and Llewelyn. Thus "Mab Ioan" or "ap Sion" (and many other variations) meaning "son of John" became the surname Jones in a large number of cases, making it a very frequently used surname.

20th and 21st centuries

Jones remains the most widespread surname in Wales, borne by around 200,000 people, or 5.75% of the population. In England it is used by around 450,000 people, or 0.75% of the population, but still the second most popular surname, after Smith. The 2000 United States census provides a frequency of 0.50%, providing an overall rank of fifth most frequent with 57.7% White, 37.7% Black, 1.4% Hispanic, 0.9% Native American. Jones was the fourth most common surname in the 1990 U.S. Census, behind only Smith, Johnson and Williams.

See also

 List of people with surname Jones
 Keeping up with the Joneses

References

External links
 "What do the statistics in the geographical location and social demographic tables mean?"
 United States Census Bureau (9 May 1995). s:1990 Census Name Files dist.all.last (1-100).

English-language surnames
Surnames of Welsh origin
Anglicised Welsh-language surnames
Patronymic surnames
Surnames from given names
Surnames of English origin
fr:Jones
nl:Jones
ja:ジョーンズ
pt:Jones (nome)
ru:Джонс
simple:Jones
fi:Jones
zh:琼斯